Glen Ferris Inn, also known as Stockton's Inn, Stockton's Tavern, and Hawkins's Hotel, is a historic hotel located on the bank of the Kanawha River overlooking Kanawha Falls at Glen Ferris, Fayette County, West Virginia. It may have been built as early as 1815.  It is a "T"-shaped brick building in two sections. One section is a three-story, painted brick dwelling.  The second is a two-story, red brick wing measuring 140 feet by 40 feet.  The building features a wraparound porch supported by 13 stuccoed brick columns.  In the 19th century, the building was a stagecoach stop and served as a Union quartermaster's depot during the American Civil War.  In the first half of the 20th century, it housed managers, supervisors, and workers involved in developing the area's manufacturing and hydro-electric capacity.

It was listed on the National Register of Historic Places in 1991.

As of December 16, 2018 the Glen Ferris inn has re-opened and is taking reservations.

References

External links
 The Historic Glen Ferris Inn, accessed 28 February 2023

American Civil War sites in West Virginia
Buildings and structures in Fayette County, West Virginia
Neoclassical architecture in West Virginia
Fayette County, West Virginia in the American Civil War
Federal architecture in West Virginia
Hotel buildings on the National Register of Historic Places in West Virginia
Houses completed in 1815
National Register of Historic Places in Fayette County, West Virginia
Vernacular architecture in West Virginia